The term Christian Catholic Church can refer to:

 the Catholic Church itself. The largest Christian denomination, which is led by the Bishop of Rome
Latin Church, also known as  the Roman Catholic Church, is the largest particular church of the Catholic Church
Eastern Church, also known as the Eastern Catholic Church, are the Eastern Christians sui iuris particular churches in full communion in the Holy See
 the Christian Catholic Apostolic Church founded in 1896 by John Alexander Dowie, also called Zionites
 the Christian Catholic Church of Switzerland
 a movement founded in October 1844 by German priest Johannes Czerski and discussed in the article on German Catholics (sect)